Rimal is a Nepali surname of Khas origin. Rimal people belong to the Bahun (Brahmin) caste and are a part of the Kaushik patriclan (gotra) of Nepali Khas-Brahmin community which forms a notable population in Nepal and India. They are sacred thread bearers (Tagadhari), twice-born Hindus and trace their origins to Indo-Aryan people.

Notable People 
 Rachana Rimal,Most successful Nepali singer.
 Gopal Prasad Rimal, Nepali poet.
 Hari Prasad Rimal, Nepali actor.
 Arbind Rimal, Nepali writer and intellectual.
 Hari Kumar Rimal, Nepalese long-distance runner.
 Shankar Nath Rimal, Nepalese civil engineer and architect.
 Pradeep Rimal, Nepalese film director, lyricist, screenwriter and cultural anthropologist.

References

Surnames of Nepalese origin
Khas surnames